Bennett Township may refer to:

 Bennett Township, Kingman County, Kansas
 Bennett Township, Fillmore County, Nebraska

Township name disambiguation pages